The Armenian Supercup is a match that is played between the Armenian Premier League Champion and Armenian Cup Winner. It is named after Hakob Tonoyan and typically takes place in May every year with some exceptions.

Results

Results by team
Since its establishment, the Armenian Supercup has been won by eight different teams. Teams shown in italics are no longer in existence.

References

https://it.wikipedia.org/wiki/Hakob_Tonoyani_anvan_Sowpergavat'

External links
 FIFA.com: Table
 RSSSF: Armenian Premier League Seasons
 Armenian Premier League directory

Supercup
National association football supercups
Spring (season) events in Armenia